Mmboniseni 'Prince' Neluonde (born 1 May 1984) is a South African lawn bowler.

Bowls career
He competed in the men's triples at the 2014 Commonwealth Games where he won a gold medal.

He was selected as part of the South Africa team for the 2018 Commonwealth Games on the Gold Coast in Queensland.

In 2019 he won the triples gold medal at the Atlantic Bowls Championships and in 2020 he was selected for the 2020 World Outdoor Bowls Championship in Australia. In 2022, he competed in the men's pairs and the men's fours at the 2022 Commonwealth Games.

References

1984 births
Living people
People from Thulamela Local Municipality
Bowls players at the 2014 Commonwealth Games
Bowls players at the 2022 Commonwealth Games
Commonwealth Games gold medallists for South Africa
South African male bowls players
Commonwealth Games medallists in lawn bowls
Sportspeople from Limpopo
Medallists at the 2014 Commonwealth Games